He Knows can refer to one of two songs:

 A song from the 2004 self-titled debut album of the rock band The Futureheads.
 The lead single from Christian music artist Jeremy Camp's 2015 album I Will Follow.
 A single by Grouper